North Brooksville is a census-designated place (CDP) in Hernando County, Florida, United States.  The population was 3,544 at the 2010 census. It is a suburb included in the Tampa-St. Petersburg-Clearwater, Florida Metropolitan Statistical Area.

Geography
North Brooksville is located in east-central Hernando County at  (28.563392, -82.400677). It borders the northwest, north, and northeast sides of the city of Brooksville, the Hernando County seat.

U.S. Route 98 runs through the western part of North Brooksville, leading south into Brooksville and northwest  to Homosassa Springs. U.S. Route 41 crosses the central reach of North Brooksville, leading south into Brooksville and north  to Inverness.

Demographics

As of the census of 2000, there were 1,461 people, 551 households, and 359 families residing in the CDP. The racial makeup of the CDP was 90.76% White, 5.48% African American, 0.55% Native American, 0.75% Asian, 0.27% from other races, and 2.19% from two or more races. Hispanic or Latino of any race were 3.01% of the population.

There were 551 households, out of which 31.8% had children under the age of 18 living with them, 44.6% were married couples living together, 14.9% had a female householder with no husband present, and 34.7% were non-families. 28.1% of all households were made up of individuals, and 10.2% had someone living alone who was 65 years of age or older.  The average household size was 2.50 and the average family size was 3.06.

In the CDP, the population was spread out, with 25.7% under the age of 18, 8.3% from 18 to 24, 25.8% from 25 to 44, 22.0% from 45 to 64, and 18.3% who were 65 years of age or older.  The median age was 38 years. For every 100 females, there were 86.1 males.  For every 100 females age 18 and over, there were 86.3 males.

The median income for a household in the CDP was $27,917, and the median income for a family was $37,455. Males had a median income of $24,728 versus $20,781 for females. The per capita income for the CDP was $13,531.  About 7.1% of families and 13.7% of the population were below the poverty line, including 4.7% of those under age 18 and 36.0% of those age 65 or over.

References

Census-designated places in Hernando County, Florida
Census-designated places in Florida